Maitté Miozotty Zamorano Cardona (born 6 January 1981) is a Bolivian footballer who plays as a forward for Deportivo ITA and the Bolivia women's national team. She is also a former athlete, who has appeared in three South American Championships in Athletics editions (2006, 2007 and 2009) and two Bolivarian Games editions (2005 and 2009).

Early life
Zamorano hails from the Santa Cruz Department.

International career
Zamorano played for Bolivia at senior level in three Copa América Femenina editions (2003, 2006 and 2018).

International goals
Scores and results list Bolivia's goal tally first

Honours and achievements

Individual
Copa Libertadores Femenina top scorer: 2013 and 2017

References

1981 births
Living people
Women's association football forwards
Bolivian women's footballers
People from Santa Cruz Department (Bolivia)
Bolivia women's international footballers
Bolivian female sprinters
Female triple jumpers
Heptathletes
Bolivian long jumpers
Bolivian shot putters